Joshua Holsey (born June 25, 1994) is a former American football cornerback. He played college football at Auburn, and was drafted by the Washington Redskins in the seventh round of the 2017 NFL Draft.

Professional career

Washington Redskins
Holsey was drafted by the Washington Redskins in the seventh round, 235th overall, in the 2017 NFL Draft.

Holsey did not participate in 2018 training camp and preseason games after suffering a non-football related foot injury when a table landed on him. The Redskins placed him on their non-football injury list at the start of the 2018 season. He was activated off the NFI list on November 12, 2018, but was waived the following day and re-signed to the practice squad. He was promoted to the active roster on December 15, 2018. He was placed on injured reserve on December 18, 2018, and was waived on May 13, 2019.

Oakland Raiders
On August 13, 2019, Holsey was signed by the Oakland Raiders. He was waived during final roster cuts on August 30, 2019.

References

External links
Auburn Tigers bio
Washington Redskins bio

1994 births
Living people
Players of American football from Georgia (U.S. state)
Sportspeople from Fulton County, Georgia
People from Fairburn, Georgia
American football cornerbacks
Auburn Tigers football players
Washington Redskins players
Oakland Raiders players